Lenni-Kim Lalande (born September 8, 2001) is a Canadian singer.

Biography

Early life
Lenni-Kim Lalande was born on September 8, 2001, in Montreal, Quebec, Canada. He is the only son of Guy Lalande and Myriam Landry.

From an early age, he imitated the singers he saw on television. At age eight, Lenni-Kim entered an advertising agency and then began to shoot advertisements and films in Quebec.

Career
In 2015, Lenni-Kim Lalande became known by participating in the second season of French TV show The Voice Kids, where he chose French singer Patrick Fiori as coach, but was eliminated from the battles. He then posted on the Internet several cover songs, including "Something Big" by Shawn Mendes and "Love Me Like You Do" by Ellie Goulding in duet with Phoebe Koyabe. To mark World Suicide Prevention Day, he launched the song "Pourquoi tout perdre", with a clip directed by Antoine Olivier Pilon and starring several actors including Marianne Verville, Alice Morel-Michaud, Camille Felton, Michaël Girard and Marc-François Blondi.

In 2017, he signed a contract with Warner Music France, which produced his album Les autres, released in June 2017. His clips, Yolo and Don't Stop have reached thirty-eight million views together, Don't Stop having recently reached twenty-four million views and Yolo reached fourteen million views.

He sang in duet with French singer Lou Jean the French credits of the second season of the series Miraculous: Tales of Ladybug & Cat Noir.

In the autumn of 2017 he participated in the eighth season of the French TV show Danse avec les stars on TF1, and finished second in the competition. Being sixteen years old at the time, he is the youngest candidate in the history of the show, all seasons combined.

He was nominated for the NRJ Music Awards in the Francophone Breakthrough of the Year category.

He participated in the Génération Enfoirés album (released on December 1, 2017) and at the Enfoirés Kids concert, recorded on November 19, 2017, and broadcast on December 1, 2017.

On February 16, 2018, he released a new clip for his song "Juste toi et moi", which reached six million views on YouTube

In 2018, he starred in five episodes of the French TV series Tomorrow Is Ours on TF1, playing the role of Zac, a Quebec penfriend for the Moreno twins.

On September 1, 2018, he participated in the French program Fort Boyard, presented by Olivier Minne, alongside singer Tal, journalist Isabelle Morini-Bosc, presenter Guillaume Pley, actress Isabelle Vitari and comedian Jeanfi Janssens, for the French association Asperger Amitié.

On July 13, 2019, he participated for the second time in the French program Fort Boyard, for the association Les Bonnes Fées, alongside the Miss France 2019 Vaimalama Chaves, the general manager of the Society Miss France Sylvie Tellier, the actress and humorist Nicole Ferroni, singer Francis Lalanne and columnist Pierre-Jean Chalençon.

On May 24, 2019, he released the lead single Minuit, which reached 7,6 Million views on YouTube, for his first EP 18, which was released on September 13, 2019. The second single, 18-Unplugged was released on September 8, 2019, Lenni Kim’s 18th birthday.

He organized a series of tours in 2018–2019, in France, Belgium, Switzerland, Quebec (Canada) and Russia.

On March 5, 2020, he released his single called BAD BUZZ which was originally for his second album which was scrapped due to the pandemic. 

In 2021 he released his single mélancolie and a Symphonic version for it as well, both videoclips together reached over a million views on YouTube.

Lenni Kim is planning to release a second EP in 2023 which will include 6 new songs.

Discography

Album 
2017: Les autres (Warner Music France)

EP 
2019: 18 (Parlophone)

Singles 
2015: Pourquoi tout perdre
2017: Don't Stop
2017: Yolo
2017: Maylin
2017: Miraculous, with Lou Jean
2018: Juste toi et moi
2018: Still Waiting For You
2019: Minuit
2019: 18 - Unplugged
2019: Ce mur qui nous sépare, with Lou Jean
2020: Bad Buzz
2021: mélancolie
2021: mélancolie (Symphonique)

Tour 
2018-2019: LK Tournée

Filmography

Short film 
2015: Pourquoi tout perdre, by Antoine Olivier Pilon: the boy

Movie 
2016: A Pact Among Angels (Le Pacte des anges), by Richard Angers: William
2022: You Can Live Forever, by Sarah Watts & Mark Slutsky: Simon
2022: Snow Day:The Musical: Dancer (Paramount+)

TV series 
2013: Les Beaux Malaises, on TVA: young Martin Matte
2015-2016: Fluffy Marky (Marc-en-peluche), on Télé-Québec: Jérôme
2018: Tomorrow Is Ours (Demain nous appartient), on TF1: Zac, Quebec penfriend for the Moreno twins
2020: Léo Matteï, Brigade des mineurs, on TF1 (season 7, episodes 1- 2): Lucas
2021: The Republic of Sarah, on The CW (1 episode): Hunter Cool Kid #1
2022: Transplant, on CTV (season 2, episode 1): Lucas
2023: Wong & Winchester (season 1, episode 5): Zander

TV shows 
2015: The Voice Kids (season 2), on TF1: candidate
2017: Danse avec les stars (season 8), on TF1: candidate
2017: Enfoirés Kids concert, on TF1: participating singer
2018: Fort Boyard, on France 2: candidate
2018: Vendredi tout est permis avec Arthur, on TF1: guest
2018: Baby-sitter : star incognito, on Gulli: the Quebec babysitter
2019: Fort Boyard, on France 2: candidate
2019: Danse avec les stars (season 10), on TF1: guest

Web shows 
2022 : Lou et Sophie (Season 1): Will
2022 : Detox (Season 1, Episode 6): James

Clips 
2014 : Aimer les monstres, Émile Proux-Cloutier
2015: Pourquoi tout perdre
2015: All I Want for Christmas Is You, cover of Mariah Carey's song
2017: Don't Stop
2017: Yolo
2017: Miraculous, with Lou Jean
2018: Juste toi et moi
2019: Minuit
2019: Ce mur qui nous sépare, with Lou Jean
2020: Bad Buzz
2021: mélancolie
2021: mélancolie - Symphonic Version

Nominations 
 2017: NRJ Music Awards: Francophone Breakthrough of the Year.
 2019: NRJ Music Awards: Francophone Breakthrough of the Year.
 2019: Olympia Awards: Music Breakthrough of the Year.

References

External links 

 

2001 births
Living people
Canadian child singers
Canadian contemporary R&B singers
Canadian Internet celebrities
Canadian pop singers
Child pop musicians
Danse avec les stars
French-language singers of Canada
Pop rock singers
Quebecers of French descent
Singers from Montreal
21st-century Canadian male singers